The Dagda (Old Irish: In Dagda) is an important god in Irish mythology. One of the Tuatha Dé Danann, the Dagda is portrayed as a father-figure, king, and druid. He is associated with fertility, agriculture, manliness and strength, as well as magic, druidry and wisdom. He can control life and death, the weather and crops, as well as time and the seasons.

He is often described as a large bearded man or giant wearing a hooded cloak. He owns a magic staff, club, or mace (the lorg mór or lorg anfaid), of dual nature: it kills with one end and brings to life with the other. He also owns a cauldron (the coire ansic) which never runs empty, and a magic harp (uaithne) which can control men's emotions and change the seasons. He is said to dwell in Brú na Bóinne (Newgrange). Other places associated with or named after him include Uisneach, Grianan of Aileach,Lough Neagh and Knock Iveagh. The Dagda is said to be husband or lover of the Morrígan and Boann. His children include Aengus, Brigit, Bodb Derg, Cermait, Aed, and Midir.

The Dagda's name is thought to mean "the good god" or "the great god". His other names include Eochu or Eochaid Ollathair ("horseman, great father"), and Ruad Rofhessa ("mighty one/lord of great knowledge"). There are indications Dáire was another name for him. The death and ancestral god Donn may originally have been a form of the Dagda, and he also has similarities with the later harvest figure Crom Dubh. Several tribal groupings saw the Dagda as an ancestor and were named after him, such as the Uí Echach and the Dáirine.

The Dagda has been likened to the Germanic god Odin, the Gaulish god Sucellos, and the Roman god Dīs Pater.

Name

Etymology 

Epithets
The Dagda has several other names or epithets which reflect aspects of his character. 
 Eochu or Eochaid Ollathair ("horseman, great father" or "horseman, all-father") 
 Ruad Rofhessa ("mighty one/lord of great knowledge") 
 Dáire ("the fertile one") 
 Aed ("the fiery one") 
 Fer Benn ("horned man" or "man of the peak")
 Cera (possibly "creator"), 
 Cerrce (possibly "striker") 
 Easal
 Eogabal

The name Eochu is a diminutive form of Eochaid, which also has spelling variants of Eochaidh and Echuid. The death and ancestral god Donn may originally have been a form of the Dagda, who is sometimes called Dagda Donn.

Description 
Tales depict the Dagda as a figure of immense power. He is said to own a magic staff, club or mace which could kill nine men with one blow; but with the handle he could return the slain to life. It was called the lorg mór ("the great staff/club/mace") or the lorg anfaid ("the staff/club/mace of wrath"). His magic cauldron was known as the coire ansic ("the un-dry cauldron") and was said to be bottomless, from which no man left unsatisfied. It was said to have a ladle so big that two people could fit in it. Uaithne, also known as "the Four Angled Music", was a richly ornamented magic harp made of oak which, when the Dagda played it, put the seasons in their correct order; other accounts tell of it being used to command the order of battle. He possessed two pigs, one of which was always growing whilst the other was always roasting, and ever-laden fruit trees. He also described as being the owner of a black-maned heifer that was given to him for his labours prior to the Second Battle of Moytura. When the heifer calls her calf, all the cattle of Ireland taken by the Fomorians as tribute graze.

The Dagda was one of the kings of the Tuatha De Danann. The Tuatha Dé Danann are the race of supernatural beings who conquered the Fomorians, who inhabited Ireland previously, prior to the coming of the Milesians. The Mórrígan is often described as his wife, his daughter was Brígh, and his lover was Boann, after whom the River Boyne is named, though she was married to Elcmar. Prior to the battle with the Fomorians, he coupled with the goddess of war, the Mórrígan, on Samhain in exchange for a plan of battle.

Despite his great power and prestige, the Dagda is sometimes depicted as oafish and crude, even comical, wearing a short, rough tunic that barely covers his rump, dragging his great penis on the ground. Such features are thought to be the additions of Christian redactors for comedic purposes.  The Middle Irish language Coir Anmann (The Fitness of Names) paints a less clownish picture: "He was a beautiful god of the heathens, for the Tuatha Dé Danann worshipped him: for he was an earth-god to them because of the greatness of his (magical) power."

The Dagda has similarities with the later harvest figure Crom Dubh. He also has similarities with the Gaulish god Sucellos, who is depicted with a hammer and a pot, and the Roman god Dīs Pater.

Family
The Dagda is said to be husband of the Morrígan, who is called his "envious wife". His children include Aengus, Cermait, and Aed (often called the three sons of the Dagda), Brigit and Bodb Derg. He is said to have two brothers, Nuada and Ogma, but this may be an instance of the tendency to triplicate deities. Elsewhere the Dagda is linked exclusively with Ogma, and the two are called "the two brothers." In the Dindsenchas, the Dagda is given a daughter named Ainge, for whom he makes a twig basket or tub that always leaks when the tide is in and never leaks when it is going out. The Dagda's father is named Elatha son of Delbeath. Englec, the daughter of Elcmar, is named as a consort of the Dagda and the mother of his "swift son". Echtgi the loathesome is another daughter of the Dagda's named in the Banshenchas.

Mythology 

Before the Second Battle of Mag Tuired the Dagda builds a fortress for Bres called Dún Brese and is also forced by the Fomorian kings Elatha, Indech, and Tethra to build raths. In the lead up to the Second Battle of Mag Tuired, when Lugh asks Dagda what power he will wield over the Fomorian host, he responds that he "will take the side of the men of Erin both in mutual smiting and destruction and wizardry. Their bones under my club will be as many as hailstones under feet of herds of horses".

The Dagda has an affair with Boann, the goddess of the River Boyne. She lives at Brú na Bóinne with her husband Elcmar. The Dagda impregnates her after sending Elcmar away on a one-day errand. To hide the pregnancy from Elcmar, the Dagda casts a spell on him, making "the sun stand still" so he will not notice the passing of time. Meanwhile, Boann gives birth to Aengus, who is also known as Maccán Óg ('the young son'). Eventually, Aengus learns that the Dagda is his true father and asks him for a portion of land. In some versions of the tale, the Dagda helps Aengus take ownership of the Brú from Elcmar. Aengus asks and is given the Brú for láa ocus aidche; because in Old Irish this could mean either "a day and a night" or "day and night", Aengus claims it forever. Other versions have Aengus taking over the Brú from the Dagda himself by using the same trick.

It has been suggested that this tale represents the winter solstice illumination of Newgrange at Brú na Bóinne, during which the sunbeam (the Dagda) enters the inner chamber (the womb of Boann) when the sun's path stands still. The word solstice (Irish grianstad) means sun-standstill. The conception of Aengus may represent the 'rebirth' of the sun at the winter solstice, him taking over the Brú from an older god representing the growing sun taking over from the waning sun.

In Tochmarc Étaíne, Dagda and Bóand help Aengus search for his love.

In a poem about Mag Muirthemne, the Dagda banishes an octopus with his "mace of wrath" using the following words: "Turn thy hollow head! Turn thy ravening body! Turn thy resorbent forehead! Avaunt! Begone!", the sea receded with the creature and the plain of Mag Muirthemne was left behind.

In the Dindsenchas the Dagda is described as swift with a poison draught and as a justly dealing lord. He is also called a King of Erin with hosts of hostages, a noble, slender prince, and the father of Cermait, Aengus, and Aed.

He is credited with a seventy- or eighty-year reign (depending on source) over the Tuatha Dé Danann, before dying at Brú na Bóinne, finally succumbing to a wound inflicted by Cethlenn during the battle of Mag Tuired.

References

Bibliography

Further reading

External links
 World History Encyclopedia – The Dagda
 * Mythical Ireland – Live Irish Myths Episode 4: The Dagda Leader of the Tuatha de Danaan

 
 

Agricultural gods
Fertility gods
Irish gods
Knowledge gods
Legendary High Kings of Ireland
Magic gods
Names of God in Irish mythology
Time and fate gods
Tuatha Dé Danann
Harvest gods
Death gods
Health gods
Wisdom gods
Sky and weather gods
Earth gods
Food deities